On 3 June 2019, an Antonov An-32 twin engine turboprop transport aircraft of the Indian Air Force en route from Jorhat Airport in Assam to Mechuka in Arunachal Pradesh lost contact with ground control about 33 minutes after takeoff. There were 13 people on board.

Passengers
There were 13 Indian Air Force personnel, eight crew members and five passengers on board the aircraft. None of them survived the crash.

Search operation 

The Antonov An-32 twin engine turboprop transport aircraft was en route from Jorhat Airport in Assam to Mechuka Advanced Landing Ground in Arunachal Pradesh on 3 June 2019. The aircraft took off from Johrat at 12:27 pm IST and lost contact with ground control at 1 pm IST, about 33 minutes after takeoff.

A fleet of Sukhoi-30, C-130J and An-32 aircraft and Mi-17 and ALH helicopters as well as the Indian Army, the Indo-Tibetan Border Police and the state police forces were deployed for the search operation. The Indian Navy's P-8i aircraft was also deployed. ISRO's Cartosat and RISAT satellites were also used.

On 12 June 2019, a team of 15 rescuers were airdropped near the crash site, but were unable to reach the location due to rough terrain and bad weather. The next day the rescue team reached the site and reported that there were no survivors, and that they had recovered the aircraft's flight recorders.

See also
 1963 Poonch Indian Air Force helicopter crash
 1986 Indian Air Force An-32 disappearance
 2016 Indian Air Force An-32 disappearance
 2019 in India

References

External links
 

2019 disasters in India
History of Arunachal Pradesh
Accidents and incidents involving the Antonov An-32
Aviation accidents and incidents in 2019
Aviation accidents and incidents in India
Indian Air Force An-32
Shi Yomi district
2010s in Arunachal Pradesh